Ernesto Tamariz Galicia (11 January 1904 – 30 September 1988) was a 20th-century Mexican sculptor specialized in public monuments, religious statues and funerary art.

His most famous work is "Altar to the Fatherland" (Altar a la patria), a memorial to the Mexican cadets killed during the Battle of Chapultepec (Niños Héroes). He also sculpted the statue of St Pio of Pietrelcina and John Paul II at the old Basilica of Our Lady of Guadalupe,  the new central altar of the Metropolitan Cathedral of Mexico City, the tomb of Alfonso Reyes at the Rotunda of Illustrious People and the tomb of Ignacio Zaragoza, among others.

Works

According to María Estela Duarte, curator of Épica y gloria monumental ("Epic and monumental glory"), a posthumous exposition of Tamariz at the Diego Rivera and Frida Kahlo Museum of Mexico City, the sculptor completed some 128 monuments throughout Mexico.

List of works
 "Altar to the Fatherland" (Altar a la patria), a memorial to the Mexican cadets killed in the Battle of Chapultepec (Niños Héroes).
 Statue of St Pio of Pietrelcina inside the old Basilica of Our Lady of Guadalupe.
 Statue of John Paul II between the old and the new the basilicas of Our Lady of Guadalupe.
 A central altar sculpted in onyx for the Metropolitan Cathedral of Mexico City.
 The tomb of Alfonso Reyes at the Rotunda of Illustrious People.
 The tomb of General Ignacio Zaragoza at San Fernando Cemetery in Mexico City.
 Statue of Benito Juárez (San Diego)

Artwork
 Monumento a los Fundadores de Puebla, 1931-1935
 Altar a la Patria, Ciudad de México, 1948-1952
 Escultura de José María Morelos, límites de la Ciudad de México y el estado de Morelos
 Escultura de Antonio Caso, Plaza del Estudiante, Ciudad de México
 Esculturas de Juan Pablo II, Escultura de San Pío y arcángeles de la Basílica de Guadalupe
 Viacrucis de la Catedral de Chihuahua
 Relieves de la Suprema Corte de Justicia de la Nación
 Monumento a Vasco de Quiroga en Quiroga, Michoacán
 Escultura a Ignacio Allende en Irapuato, Guanajuato
 Monumento a José de San Martín en la colonia Polanco, Ciudad de México
 Escultura de Rafael Cabrera, Puebla, 1951
 Esculturas en Almoloya de Juárez, 1953
 Escultura de José María Yáñez, Guaymas,
 Tumba de Manuel M. Ponce en la Rotonda de las Personas Ilustres, Ciudad de México (1954)
 Altar central y esculturas en la Catedral Metropolitana de la Ciudad de México (1957)
 Virgen de Guadalupe, Lourdes
 Bustos de Carranza, Obregón y Calles, La Paz, Baja California Sur (1958)
 Escultura de Felipe Pescador en la Estación de Buenavista, Ciudad de México
 Escultura La Fama en el Toreo de Cuatro Caminos
 Escultura de Alfonso Reyes en el campus de la Universidad Autónoma de Nuevo León
 Tumba de Ignacio Zaragoza en el Panteón de San Fernando, Ciudad de México 
 Tumba de Alfonso Reyes, Rotonda de las Personas Ilustres, Ciudad de México
 Bustos de aviadores en el Aeropuerto Internacional de la Ciudad de México
 Monumento a la Victoria del 5 de mayo, Puebla (1961)
 Esculturas de María Auxiliadora y ángeles de la parroquia de Santa Julia, Ciudad de México (1961).
 Esculturas de Hipócrates y Platón en el Centro Médico Nacional Siglo XXI, Ciudad de México (1962)
 Escultura de Juan Diego, Cuautitlán (1962)
 Relieves de la sede del Instituto Mexicano del Seguro Social, Xalapa (1963)
 Cristo de madera para la catedral de Torreón (1963)
 La Marsellesa, Conjunto Habitacional Unidad Independencia, Ciudad de México (1964)
 Escultura de Belisario Domínguez, Nuevo Laredo (1965)

References

External links

Mexican sculptors
Male sculptors
1904 births
1988 deaths
People from Puebla
Art Nouveau sculptors
Art Deco sculptors
20th-century sculptors